Lecontella is a genus of checkered beetles in the family Cleridae. There are at least four described species in Lecontella.

Species
These four species belong to the genus Lecontella:
 Lecontella brunnea (Spinola, 1844).
 Lecontella cancellata (LeConte, 1854).
 Lecontella gnara Wolcott, 1927.
 Lecontella striatopunctata Chevrolat, 1876.

References

Further reading

 
 
 
 

Tillinae
Articles created by Qbugbot